Eranga Rathnayake (born 23 January 1992) is a Sri Lankan cricketer. He made his first-class debut for Saracens Sports Club in the 2011–12 Premier Trophy on 24 February 2012. He made his List A debut for Galle District in the 2016–17 Districts One Day Tournament on 26 March 2017.

References

External links
 

1992 births
Living people
Sri Lankan cricketers
Galle District cricketers
Ragama Cricket Club cricketers
Saracens Sports Club cricketers
Cricketers from Colombo